Thomas Broham (20 July 1840 – 29 December 1900) was a New Zealand police officer. He was born in County Limerick, Ireland on 20 July 1840.

He is known for arresting the arsonist Cyrus Haley.

References

1840 births
1900 deaths
New Zealand police officers
Irish emigrants to New Zealand (before 1923)